Kashimo Bosai Dam is a gravity dam located in Gifu Prefecture in Japan. The dam is used for flood control. The catchment area of the dam is 16 km2. The dam impounds about 7  ha of land when full and can store 733 thousand cubic meters of water. The construction of the dam was started on 1969 and completed in 1975.

References

Dams in Gifu Prefecture
1975 establishments in Japan